Osminia namibiana is a moth of the family Sesiidae. It is known from Namibia.

References

Sesiidae
Moths described in 2004